Javier Pascual Llorente (born 30 March 1971 in Alfaro, La Rioja) is a former Spanish cyclist.

Palmarès

1998
5th stage Vuelta a Colombia
2000
1st stage Volta a la Comunitat Valenciana
2nd overall Vuelta a Murcia
2001
1st and 5th stages Vuelta a Castilla y León
2nd overall Vuelta a Murcia
10th overall Clásica de San Sebastián
2003
Vuelta a Murcia:
General classification
2nd and 5th stages
Vuelta a Andalucía:
General classification
3rd stage
3rd overall Volta a la Comunitat Valenciana

References

1971 births
Living people
Spanish male cyclists
Cyclists from La Rioja (Spain)